"Givin' All My Love" is a song by Italian Eurodance project Whigfield which was performed by Danish-born Sannie Charlotte Carlson. It is written by Annerley Gordon, Daniela Galli, Davide Riva and Paul Sears. The song was released on 19 March 1998 as the final single from her second album Whigfield II. "Givin' All My Love" was released in Europe and Scandinavia. peaking at number 33 on the (Eurochart Hot 100).

Track listing
CD maxi
Europe
 Givin' All My Love (original radio edit) 3:36
 Givin' All My Love (Alesis edit mix) 3:58
 Givin' All My Love (Alesis extended mix) 5:48
 Givin' All My Love (Gambadubs easy mix) 6:33

Scandinavia
 Givin' All My Love (Alesis edit mix) 3:58
 Givin' All My Love (Alesis extended mix) 5:48
 Givin' All My Love (original radio edit) 3:36
 Givin' All My Love (Gambadubs easy mix) 6:33

Personnel
Executive Producer – Larry Pignagnoli
Producers – Davide Riva, Larry Pignagnoli
Written by Annerley Gordon, D. Galli*, Davide Riva, Paul Sears

Charts

References

External links

1997 songs
Whigfield songs
Songs written by Ann Lee (singer)
1998 singles
Songs written by Dhany